The 2017–18 Morgan State Bears men's basketball team represented Morgan State University during the 2017–18 NCAA Division I men's basketball season. The Bears, led by 12th-year head coach Todd Bozeman, played their home games at the Talmadge L. Hill Field House in Baltimore, Maryland as members of the Mid-Eastern Athletic Conference. They finished the season 13–19, 7–9 in MEAC play to finish in a three-way tie for seventh place. As the No. 7 seed in the MEAC tournament, they defeated South Carolina State and Bethune–Cookman before losing to North Carolina Central in the semifinals.

Previous season
The Bears finished the 2016–17 season 14–16, 11–5 in MEAC play to finish in a tie for third place. They lost in the quarterfinals of the MEAC tournament to Howard.

Preseason
The Bears were picked to win the MEAC, receiving 13 first place votes, in the preseason MEAC poll.

Phillip Carr and Tiwian Kendley were named to the Preseason All-MEAC First Team.

Roster

Schedule and results

|-
!colspan=9 style=| Non-conference regular season

|-
!colspan=9 style=| MEAC regular season

|-
!colspan=9 style=| MEAC tournament

References

Morgan State Bears men's basketball seasons
Morgan State
Morgan
Morgan